Inamona is a condiment or relish used in traditional Hawaiian cooking made from roasted kukui nut (candlenuts) and sea salt. It is sometimes mixed with seaweeds, often accompanying meals. Inamona is often served with fresh fish.

Uses
Inamona is used in poke and sometimes sushi.
It enhances the flavor of the poke, which may be served "Hawaiian style" with a mix of sesame oil, limu, salt, and yellowfin tuna (ahi) or sometimes skipjack tuna (aku).

Resources

Hawaiian condiments
Polynesian cuisine
Condiments